Ryan Bennett Fry (born July 25, 1978) is a retired Canadian curler currently living in Pickering, Ontario he most recently played third on the Mike McEwen team and coached the Rachel Homan team. He previously played third for Team Brad Jacobs, and the team represented Canada and won the gold medal at the 2014 Winter Olympics. The team also won the 2013 Tim Hortons Brier. Fry won a silver medal at the 2013 World Men's Curling Championship.

Career
Fry was born in Winnipeg, Manitoba, on July 25, 1978. Fry is a right-handed shooter and delivers "tuck" style. Fry skipped a junior men's team to the 1996 Canadian Junior Curling Championships and 1997 Canadian Junior Curling Championships representing Manitoba. Fry skipped men's teams to the 2005 and 2006 Manitoba Safeway Select (playdown to the Brier) and joined Jeff Stoughton's team playing third for the 2006–07 season.

Fry qualified for the 2014 Winter Olympics with the Brad Jacobs rink after defeating the John Morris rink in the final.

Fry accompanied the Stoughton rink to the 2007 Tim Hortons Brier in Hamilton where they lost the semi-finals to Glenn Howard's Ontario rink.  Fry curled 85% in the round robin (second among thirds).

Fry left the Stoughton rink in 2008 to play for Brad Gushue's team in St. John's, Newfoundland and Labrador.  Fry won the 2009, 2010, 2011 and 2012 Newfoundland and Labrador Tankards with the team, and represented Newfoundland and Labrador at the 2009, 2010, 2011 and 2012 Briers. Fry played with Gushue until moving to Sault Ste. Marie to play with Jacobs in 2012. Fry won his first The Dominion Northern Ontario Men's Curling Championship in 2013 with Jacobs and represented Northern Ontario at the Brier for the first time in 2013. This tied Earle Morris's record for most provinces represented at the Brier (at three; a feat which has since been duplicated by Earle's son John).  Fry won the Brier with Northern Ontario and represented Canada at the 2013 Ford World Men's Curling Championship where the rink won a silver medal.

The Jacobs rink won the 2013 Canadian Olympic Curling Trials and went on to win the gold medal at the 2014 Winter Olympics.

Team Jacobs with Fry still at third would lose the 2015 Brier final to Team Canada (skipped Pat Simmons), win a bronze at the 2016 Brier, and lose the bronze medal game to Mike McEwen at the 2017 Brier. The team finished off the podium at the 2018 Tim Hortons Brier, finishing fourth.

After a November 2018 incident involving "unsportsmanlike behaviour" at the Red Deer Curling Classic (where Fry was sparing on a team skipped by Jamie Koe), Fry and others on his team were barred from the event and Fry announced he was taking a leave of absence. Fry missed two events on the team, but would return for the 2019 Canadian Open in January. Fry along with Team Jacobs represented Northern Ontario at the 2019 Tim Hortons Brier. The team went 9-2 in the round robin and championship round combined. Jacobs lost the 1 vs. 2 game to Kevin Koe and the semifinal to Brendan Bottcher resulting in the team getting the bronze medal. Team Jacobs announced in March 2019 that Fry would be parting ways with the team after the end of the 2018-2019 curling season. Fry played with the rink for 7 years but would join Team Epping for the 2019-20 season.

Team Epping had a strong start to the year, winning both the Stu Sells Oakville Tankard and the 2019 AMJ Campbell Shorty Jenkins Classic. They had a semifinal finish at the Masters, the first Grand Slam of the season. They missed the playoffs at the next two slams, the Tour Challenge and the National after going 1–3 at both. Team Epping posted a 6–2 record en route to winning the 2019 Canada Cup in Leduc, Alberta. This win qualified them to represent Team Canada along with five other Canadian teams at the 2020 Continental Cup where they lost 22.5–37.5 to the Europeans. They had a strong showing at the Canadian Open where they made it all the way to the final where they lost to the Brad Jacobs rink. At the 2020 Ontario Tankard, they completed their undefeated run throughout the week with an 8–3 win over Glenn Howard. Representing Ontario at the 2020 Tim Hortons Brier, they finished the championship pool with a 7–4 record and in a four way tie for fourth place. They defeated Team Wild Card (Mike McEwen) in the first tiebreaker before losing to Northern Ontario (Brad Jacobs) in the second and being eliminated from contention. It would be the team's last event of the season as both the Players' Championship and the Champions Cup Grand Slam events were cancelled due to the COVID-19 pandemic.

Team Epping began the 2020–21 season with a win at the 2020 Stu Sells Toronto Tankard. The 2021 Ontario provincial playdowns were cancelled due to the COVID-19 pandemic in Ontario. As the 2020 provincial champions, Team Epping was chosen to represent Ontario at the 2021 Tim Hortons Brier in Calgary. At the Brier, they finished with a 7–5 record.

Personal life
Fry's father is Barry Fry, winner of the 1979 Brier, the Canadian Men's Curling Championship.

Fry attended the University of Manitoba where he graduated with a bachelor's degree in Business Administration. He is married to Jessica Szabo.

References

External links

Living people
1978 births
Curlers from Winnipeg
Sportspeople from St. John's, Newfoundland and Labrador
Curlers from Newfoundland and Labrador
Curlers from Northern Ontario
Curlers from Toronto
Sportspeople from Sault Ste. Marie, Ontario
Brier champions
Olympic curlers of Canada
Curlers at the 2014 Winter Olympics
Medalists at the 2014 Winter Olympics
Olympic gold medalists for Canada
Olympic medalists in curling
University of Manitoba alumni
Canadian male curlers
Continental Cup of Curling participants
Canada Cup (curling) participants
People from Pickering, Ontario
Canadian curling coaches